The 1981–82 James Madison Dukes men's basketball team represented James Madison University during the 1981–82 NCAA Division I men's basketball season. The Dukes, led by tenth year head coach Lou Campanelli, played their home games at the newly opened on-campus Convocation Center and were members of the southern division of the Eastern Collegiate Athletic Conference (ECAC).

The Dukes finished the season with a 24–6 (10–1 ECAC South) record, but were upset by Old Dominion in the ECAC South tournament. However, the Dukes received an at-large bid to the 1982 NCAA Division I men's basketball tournament for their second-ever and second-consecutive appearance in the tournament. In the NCAA Tournament, the ninth-seeded Dukes beat Ohio State in the first round before falling to eventual national champions North Carolina in the second round.

Previous season

Schedule

|-
!colspan=9 style=|Regular Season

|-
!colspan=9 style=| ECAC South tournament
|-

|-
!colspan=9 style=| NCAA tournament
|-

Source:

References

James Madison Dukes men's basketball seasons
James Madison
James Madison
James Madison Men's Basketball
James Madison Men's Basketball